Eduardo Arturo Sanchez (born November 4, 1982) is an American professional mixed martial artist who last competed in the Heavyweight division. A professional since 2004, he has competed for the UFC, Bellator, Titan FC, Final Fight Championship, and King of the Cage.

Background
Sanchez played baseball at San Marcos High School, excelling as a pitcher, and then continued at his career at Palomar College. However, his career was cut short when he was injured after a near fatal drunk driving accident. Sanchez was 20 years old and driving with a friend while intoxicated. Sanchez flew through the windshield and almost had one of his legs amputated because of the injuries.

Mixed martial arts career

Ultimate Fighting Championship
On February 3, 2007, with a 1-0 promotional record, Sanchez faced Mirko Cro Cop at UFC 67. Sanchez lost via TKO due to punches at 4:33 of the first round, in Cro Cop's debut fight in the UFC. Average betting for this fight was around -1200 for Cro Cop and +800 for Eddie Sanchez, the biggest gap for underdog/favorite in UFC history.

Sanchez defeated Irish heavyweight Colin Robinson by TKO at UFC 72.

At UFC 79, held on December 29, 2007, Sanchez defeated Soa Palalei via TKO (strikes). Sanchez went on to lose to Antoni Hardonk at UFC 85 in London on June 7, 2008. Sanchez took the Hardonk fight on short notice, as a late replacement for Neil Wain. Sanchez was noticeably out of shape at the weigh in, but despite this, he knocked Hardonk down twice, once in the first round and once in the second, before succumbing to strikes at 4:15 in the second round. Sanchez next faced Justin McCully at UFC: Fight for the Troops on December 10,2008, he lost the via unanimous decision and was released from the promotion.

Bellator Fighting Championships
Sanchez debuted for Bellator at Bellator 7, recording a ten-second knock out.

His next Bellator bout was scheduled against Ralph Kelly at Bellator 20. Kelly pulled out of the bout and was replaced by Wayne Cole. Cole then pulled out of the fight and was replaced by Marcus Sursa.  Sanchez won via TKO in the third round.  With this win, Eddie will take a spot in the third season heavyweight tournament.

Titan Fighting Championships
Sanchez was scheduled to fight Bobby Lashley at Titan Fighting Championships 19. But on July 22, it was announced that Lashley withdrew from the fight due to personal reasons.

Sanchez fought Strikeforce veteran Brett Rogers at Titan Fighting Championships 20. Sanchez won by split decision.

Independent promotions
Sanchez then faced Damian Grabowski at MMA Attack 2 on April 27, 2012. Sanchez was submitted via kimura at 2:02 in the second round.

The following June, Sanchez faced future Bellator Heavyweight champion Vitaly Minakov at The Battle of Moscow 7. Sanchez was defeated in the first round via KO.

After a long layoff, Sanchez eventually returned and faced Stjepan Bekavac at FFC11: Jurković vs. Kaluđerović on April 4, 2014. Sanchez was knocked out in the first round, marking his third loss in a row.

Championships and accomplishments
Ultimate Fighting Championship
Knockout of the Night (One time) vs. Soa Palelei

Mixed martial arts record

|-
| Loss
| align=center| 15–8
| Stjepan Bekavac
| KO (punch)
| FFC11: Jurkovic vs. Kaluderovic
| 
| align=center| 1
| align=center| 1:07
| Osijek, Croatia
| 
|-
| Loss
| align=center| 15–7
| Vitaly Minakov
| KO (punch)
| Fight Nights Global 9
| 
| align=center| 1
| align=center| 1:59
| Moscow, Russia
| 
|-
| Loss
| align=center| 15–6
| Damian Grabowski
| Submission (kimura)
| MMA Attack 2
| 
| align=center| 2
| align=center| 2:02
| Katowice, Poland
| 
|-
| Win
| align=center| 15–5
| Brett Rogers
| Decision (split) 
| Titan Fighting Championships 20
| 
| align=center| 3
| align=center| 5:00
| Kansas City, Kansas, United States
| 
|-
| Loss
| align=center| 14–5
| Mike Whitehead
| Decision (split) 
| Pure Fighting Championships 6
| 
| align=center| 3
| align=center| 5:00
| Red Deer, Alberta, Canada
| 
|-
| Loss
| align=center| 14–4
| Neil Grove
| TKO (punches)
| Bellator 24
| 
| align=center| 1
| align=center| 1:32
| Hollywood, Florida, United States
| 
|-
| Win
| align=center| 14–3
| Marcus Sursa
| TKO (punches)
| Bellator 20
| 
| align=center| 3
| align=center| 0:23
| San Antonio, Texas, United States
| 
|-
| Win
| align=center| 13–3
| Mark Honneger
| Decision (unanimous)
| Maximo Fighting Championship
| 
| align=center| 3
| align=center| 5:00
| San Juan, Puerto Rico
| 
|-
| Win
| align=center| 12–3
| Vince Lucero
| Submission (guillotine choke)
| Total Combat 33
| 
| align=center| 1
| align=center| 0:27
| Mexico City, Mexico
| 
|-
| Win
| align=center| 11–3
| Jay White
| KO (punches)
| Bellator 7
| 
| align=center| 1
| align=center| 0:10
| Chicago, Illinois, United States
| 
|-
| Loss
| align=center| 10–3
| Justin McCully
| Decision (unanimous)
| UFC: Fight for the Troops
| 
| align=center| 3
| align=center| 5:00
| Fayetteville, North Carolina, United States
| 
|-
| Loss
| align=center| 10–2
| Antoni Hardonk
| KO (punches)
| UFC 85
| 
| align=center| 2
| align=center| 4:15
| London, England
| 
|-
| Win
| align=center| 10–1
| Soa Palelei
| TKO (punches)
| UFC 79
| 
| align=center| 3
| align=center| 3:24
| Las Vegas, Nevada, United States
| 
|-
| Win
| align=center| 9–1
| Colin Robinson
| TKO (punches)
| UFC 72
| 
| align=center| 2
| align=center| 0:32
| Belfast, Northern Ireland
| 
|-
| Loss
| align=center| 8–1
| Mirko Cro Cop
| TKO (punches)
| UFC 67
| 
| align=center| 1
| align=center| 4:33
| Las Vegas, Nevada, United States
| 
|-
| Win
| align=center| 8–0
| Mario Neto
| KO (punches)
| UFC 63: Hughes vs. Penn
| 
| align=center| 2
| align=center| 0:17
| Anaheim, California, United States
| 
|-
| Win
| align=center| 7–0
| Wade Shipp
| TKO (punches)
| TC 13: Anarchy
| 
| align=center| 3
| align=center| 4:32
| Del Mar, California, United States
| 
|-
| Win
| align=center| 6–0
| Josh Tamsen
| TKO (strikes)
| Total Combat 11
| 
| align=center| 1
| align=center| N/A
| Tijuana, Mexico
| 
|-
| Win
| align=center| 5–0
| Julian Rush
| TKO (corner stoppage)
| Total Combat 10
| 
| align=center| 1
| align=center| 5:00
| San Diego, California, United States
| 
|-
| Win
| align=center| 4–0
| Adrian Perez
| Submission (punches)
| KOTC 61: Flash Point
| 
| align=center| 1
| align=center| 0:11
| San Jacinto, California, United States
| 
|-
| Win
| align=center| 3–0
| Anthony Ruiz
| Technical Submission (triangle choke)
| KOTC 54: Mucho Machismo
| 
| align=center| 1
| align=center| 2:49
| San Jacinto, California, United States
| 
|-
| Win
| align=center| 2–0
| Tony Towers
| TKO (strikes)
| Total Combat 7
| 
| align=center| 1
| align=center| N/A
| Tijuana, Mexico
| 
|-
| Win
| align=center| 1–0
| Adan Arceo
| TKO (strikes)
| Total Combat 5
| 
| align=center| 1
| align=center| N/A
| Tijuana, Mexico
|

References

External links

 
 

American male mixed martial artists
American mixed martial artists of Mexican descent
American sportspeople of Dominican Republic descent
Heavyweight mixed martial artists
1982 births
Living people
People from La Jolla, San Diego
People from Huntington Beach, California
Ultimate Fighting Championship male fighters